Rhonda Rhoads (born October 12, 1950) is an American politician who served in the Indiana House of Representatives from the 70th district from 2010 to 2016.

References

1950 births
Living people
Republican Party members of the Indiana House of Representatives
21st-century American politicians
21st-century American women politicians
People from Harrison County, Indiana
Women state legislators in Indiana